Włodzimierz Tomaszewski (born 16 November 1956 in Łódź) is a Polish politician who was vice president of Łódź (2002–2010) and a member of the IX Sejm.

References 

1956 births
Living people
Members of the Polish Sejm 2019–2023
Politicians from Łódź